Baseball was one of 19 sports included in the 1999 All-Africa Games held during September of that year in Johannesburg, South Africa.  It marked the first of two editions of the Games during which baseball would be included.  Six teams participated in the tournament, with the winner being qualified for a playoff with the champion of Oceania, the winner of which would be then qualified for the 2000 Summer Olympics in Australia.

South Africa dominated the tournament handily, outscoring their opponents by double digits.  They went on to the Olympic qualifying playoff against Guam where they similarly were successful, sweeping a best-of-five-series played in Johannesburg in December 1999, earning the team's first and only qualification for Olympic baseball.  South African players led most of the statistical categories for the tournament, including the top hitter, Ian Holness, who batted .909 with 10 hits in 11 at-bats.

Participants

Format
The tournament was played in a single round-robin format, with each team playing each other team once.

Results

Standings

Game log

References
 7th All Africa Games Baseball Results

1999 All-Africa Games
1999 in baseball
1999 All-Africa Games
1999
Baseball at the 2000 Summer Olympics
Qualification for the 2000 Summer Olympics